= Radyo Negrense =

Bacolod; Philippines
- Broadcast area: Northern Negros Occidental and surrounding areas
- Frequency: 100.3 MHz
- Branding: Radyo Negrense 100.3

Programming
- Languages: Hiligaynon, Filipino
- Format: Community radio

Ownership
- Owner: Negros Occidental Provincial Government

History
- First air date: March 22, 2022

Technical information
- Power: 10,000 watts

Radyo Negrense 100.3 (100.3 FM) is a radio station owned and operated by the Provincial Government of Negros Occidental. The station's studio and transmitter are located along Aguinaldo St., Bacolod.
